The Peacock Princess, also Kongque Gongzhu, is a folktale of the Dai people in China, with shared origins with other similar tales found throughout Southeast Asia. The tale is also considered to be a version of the international "swan maiden" narrative.

History

The tale originated within the people of the Dai ethnic group who worshiped peacocks, and is reported to have circulated among them for centuries. The Dai people worship peacocks as being messengers of peace, kindness, love and beauty.

Names
The tale is celebrated amongst the Dai people of China and was recorded as a poem and folk story known under several names, such as Shaoshutun, The Peacock Princess, Zhao Shutun and Lanwuluona, Zhao Shu Tun and Nan Nuo Na, or Zhao Shudeng and Nanmu Nuonuo.

Plot

The tale follows the story of a young prince named Zhao Shutun (and variations; see above), who is looking for a bride. One day, he is guided to a lake where seven peacock maidens are bathing (or dancing), and he falls in love with the seventh and youngest of them, the Peacock Princess. The prince steals her peacock feathers while she is distracted and waits for the other birds to fly away before he appears to her. The prince returns her feathers and she agrees to become his bride.

They fly back to his kingdom and marry. On their wedding night, the evil wizard puts a spell on the king and starts a war. The young prince leaves for battle and while he is gone his princess is sentenced to death by the king. Before she is executed, she takes on peacock form and escapes. When the prince returns from battle, he kills the evil wizard and releases the king from the spell, but begins a long quest to the Peacock Kingdom to regain his wife. Fortunately, he finds his wife again, and everyone lives happily ever after.

 Kingdom Oudor Bangchal (Mueang Bangchal, Mường Bản-trát, 勐板扎)
 Heavenly kingdom Kaylas of Himalaya
 King Atichakvong
 Queen Chantea Devi
 Prince Preah Sothun (Chao Sisouthone, Triệu Thụ-đồn, Lê Tư-thành, 召樹屯)
 Princess Neang Keo Monorea (Nang Manola, Nam Mục-nhược-na, Nhồi-hoa, 喃穆婼娜)
 God of Naga (dragon king, lord of water)
 Seven kenoreis
 King Preah Bat Tommakreach
 Brahman's grand master (as Ramasura or Ream Eyso)
 Chranieng (kind of tree)
 Mount Meru
 Damloeng

Culture
This legend was made into a Chinese film in 1963 and 1982 with the same title.

See also

 Manimekhala
 Manohara
 Mayilattam
 Peacock dance
 The blue bird
 Finist the Falcon

References

Books
 Norodom Buppha Devi, Le Cambodge, renaissance de la tradition khmère. Preah Sothun (création), danse classique, Cité de la musique, Paris, France, 2004.
 Sotheary Kimsun, Brʹaḥ S'uthn nʹāng kʹaevmnʹorʹāh̊ : Preah Sothun and Neang Keo Monorea, Reading Books, 2009.
 Isabelle Soulard, Preah Sothun neang Keo Monorea, France.

Further reading
 Hao Huixiao; Ren Jiajia. "A Study on the English Translation and Transmission of Ancient Dai Ballad Zhao Shutun from the Perspective of Reader's Reception". In: Journal of Dali University. Vol.4 No.9 Sep. 2019, pp. 39–45. DOI: 10.3969/j.issn.2096-2266.2019.09.007 (In Chinese)

External links
 ស្នេហាលន្លង់លន្លោចនៃព្រះសុធននាងកែវមនោហរា (រឿងខ្មែរ, រឿងចិន)
 រឿងចៅកាំបិតបន្ទោ
 Moni Mekhala and Ream Eyso
 The peacock princess in Yunnan

Dai people
Female characters in fairy tales
Fictional kings
Fictional princes